YouTube Shorts is the short-form section of the video-sharing website YouTube, hosting content much like YouTube's primary service but with a focus on vertical videos at a maximum length of 60 seconds. Videos with a square aspect ratio are also accepted. As of January 2022, Shorts have collectively earned over 5 trillion views since the platform was made available to the public on July 13, 2021 which include video views that pre-date the YouTube Shorts feature.

History

In 2019, as a response to competition from TikTok, YouTube started experimenting with showing vertical videos up to a length of 30 seconds in their own section on the homepage. This early beta was released only to a small number of people. Shortly after TikTok was banned in India in September 2020, the YouTube Shorts beta was made available in the country. In March 2021, the beta was released in the U.S. Shorts was globally released on July 13, 2021.

In January 2022, a study showed that scammers were garnering millions of views by pirating popular videos from TikTok and posting them on YouTube Shorts. They pinned comments on their reposted videos containing commercial links, which generated money for them on a cost per action or cost per lead basis.

In August 2022, YouTube announced plans to make the Shorts feature available on its smart TV app.

In December 2022, YouTube published its annual blog post documenting the top videos and creators of the year, with Shorts receiving its own section of the post for the first time.

Features
YouTube Shorts presents user-generated vertical or square videos up to 60 seconds long. It allows users to add licensed music and on-screen captions. Viewers can scroll through an endless queue of videos. YouTube Shorts offers editing capabilities and the ability to interact with viewers by responding to comments with additional videos, the latter being a feature primarily made popular by TikTok. Although intended to be watched on smartphones, YouTube Shorts can be viewed on all other devices. As opposed to most Youtube videos, Youtube Shorts cannot be rewinded or fast-forwarded by the viewer.

Monetization
In August 2021, YouTube released the YouTube Shorts fund, a system in which the top Shorts creators could get paid for their work. YouTube described this as a way to "monetize and reward creators for their content" and said it would be a $100 million fund distributed throughout 2021 and 2022, similar to TikTok's $1 billion creator fund. YouTube told The Hollywood Reporter that the fund is "just a stopgap until YouTube develops a long-term monetization and support tool for short-form creators" that will be "modeled after but differ from" its Partner Program. When the fund was released, YouTube sent offers to over 3,000 creators that ranged from $100 to $10,000 per month.
.

References

External links 
 
 YouTube Creators page
 New Features and Updates for Shorts Viewers & Creators

YouTube
Internet properties established in 2020
2020 in Internet culture